Tatyana Mikhailovna Lioznova (20 July 192429 September 2011) was a Soviet film director best known for her TV series Seventeen Moments of Spring (1973).

Film career
All of Lioznova's featuresfrom Three Poplars in Plyushcikha (1967), a cult film of the 1960s, to her last movie, Carnival (1981),are distinguished by open narratives, psychologically penetrating close-ups, and poignant musical scores.

The subtle and touching drama Three Poplars at Plyuschikha Street (1967) sprouted from Aleksandra Pakhmutova’s song “Tenderness”. The starry duet of Tatiana Doronina and Oleg Yefremov is a masterpiece of acting. This story of a nearly sprung love of a taxi driver and a married peasant woman won the hearts of Russian viewers, just like Casablanca gained the love of Americans.

Known as a tireless perfectionist, filming just half a dozen features, this didn't prevent her becoming People's Artist of the USSR in 1984. She worked at the Gorky Film Studio.

Lioznova devoted many efforts and much time to teaching. Among the students of Professor Lioznova there are a lot of cinematographers well-known today.

Personal life
Lioznova was never married, but adopted a daughter Lyudmila Lisina in the 1960s.

Political activity
Lioznova was Jewish and was a member of the Anti-Zionist Committee of the Soviet Public from 1983 to the closing of Committee in 1994.

Filmography

 The Memory of the Heart (1958)
 Yevdokiya (1961)
 They Conquer the Skies (1963)
 At Early Morning (1965)
 Early in the Morning (1966)
 Three Poplars in Plyushcikha (1967)
 Seventeen Moments of Spring  (1973); TV mini-series
 We, the Undersigned (1981)
 Carnival (1981)
 End of the World with Symposium to Follow (1986)

Honours and awards
 Order of Merit for the Fatherland;
3rd class (20 July 1999) - for outstanding contribution to cinema
4th class (20 July 2009) - for outstanding contribution to the development of the domestic art of film and many years of creative activity
 Order of Honour (9 March 1996) - for services to the state, many years of fruitful work in the arts and culture
 Order of the Red Banner of Labour
 Order of Friendship of Peoples
 Order of the October Revolution (1982)
 People's Artist of the USSR (1984)
 People's Artist of the RSFSR (1974)
 Honoured Artist of the RSFSR (1969)
 Special Prize of the President of the Russian Federation "For outstanding contribution to the development of Russian cinema" (12 June 2000)
 State Prize of the RSFSR Vasiliev brothers (1976) - a multi-part television film "Seventeen Moments of Spring"

Tribute
On July 20, 2020, Google celebrated her 96th birthday with a Google Doodle.

References

External links
 
 Lioznova's on her 80th birthday: Jewish Happiness Befell Me
 Imperishable Moments of Tatyana Lioznova

1924 births
2011 deaths
Anti-Zionist Jews
Soviet women film directors
Gerasimov Institute of Cinematography alumni
Academic staff of the Gerasimov Institute of Cinematography
Recipients of the Order "For Merit to the Fatherland", 2nd class
People's Artists of the USSR
Recipients of the Order of Honour (Russia)
Recipients of the Order of Friendship of Peoples
People's Artists of Russia
Honored Artists of the RSFSR
Recipients of the Vasilyev Brothers State Prize of the RSFSR
Russian Jews
Soviet Jews
Soviet film directors